The 2018–19 Coupe de France was the 102nd season of the main football cup competition of France. The competition was organised by the French Football Federation (FFF) and was open to all clubs in French football, as well as clubs from the overseas departments and territories (Guadeloupe, French Guiana, Martinique, Mayotte, New Caledonia (AS Magenta, winner of 2018 New Caledonia Cup), Tahiti (AS Dragon, winner of 2017–18 Tahiti Cup), Réunion, Saint Martin and Saint Pierre and Miquelon).

Paris Saint-Germain were the four-time defending champions, but lost in the final on penalties to Rennes, who won their third Coupe de France title and first since 1971.

Dates

Dates for the first two qualifying round are set by the individual Regional leagues. The remaining qualifying rounds, the seventh and eight round, and the round of 64 take place at weekends. The later rounds up to, but not including, the final, take place on midweek evenings. The final will take place on Saturday 27 April 2019.

Teams

Round 1 to 6

The first six rounds, and any preliminaries required, are organised by the Regional Leagues and the Overseas Territories, who allow teams from within their league structure to enter at any point up to the third round. Teams from Championnat National 3 enter at the third round, those from Championnat National 2 enter at the fourth round and those from Championnat National enter at the fifth round.

The number of teams entering at each qualifying round was as follows:

Round 7
145 qualifiers from the Regional Leagues will be joined by the 11 qualifiers from the Overseas Territories and the 20 teams from Ligue 2.

Ligue 2

 Ajaccio
 Auxerre
 Béziers
 Brest
 Châteauroux
 Clermont
 Gazélec Ajaccio
 Grenoble
 Le Havre
 Lens

 Lorient
 Metz
 Nancy
 Niort
 Orléans
 Paris FC
 Red Star
 Sochaux
 Troyes
 Valenciennes

Regional Leagues
Figures in parenthesis indicate the tier of the French football league system the team play at.

Nouvelle-Aquitaine: 12 teams
 Pau FC (3)
 Bergerac Périgord FC (4)
 Genêts Anglet (5)
 Angoulême CFC (5)
 FC Chauray (5)
 US Chauvigny (5)
 US Lège Cap Ferret (5)
 Limoges FC (5)
 Stade Poitevin FC (5)
 SO Châtellerault (6)
 La Brède FC (6)
 FC Tartas-St Yaguen (6)

Pays de la Loire: 11 teams
 SO Cholet (3)
 Le Mans FC (3)
 Les Herbiers VF (4)
 FC Challans (5)
 USSA Vertou (5)
 Vendée Fontenay Foot (5)
 JSC Bellevue Nantes (6)
 AS Bourny Laval (6)
 AS La Châtaigneraie (6)
 Vendée Poiré-sur-Vie Football (7)
 FC La Chapelle-des-Marais (8)

Centre-Val de Loire: 4 teams
 Tours FC (3)
 Blois Football 41 (4)
 Saint-Pryvé Saint-Hilaire FC (4)
 Bourges Foot (5)

Corsica: 2 teams
 FC Bastia-Borgo (4)
 SC Bastia (5)

Bourgogne-Franche-Comté: 8 teams
 Besançon Football (5)
 FC Gueugnon (5)
 US La Charité (5)
 Louhans-Cuiseaux FC (5)
 FC Montceau Bourgogne (5)
 FC Morteau-Montlebon (5)
 US Cheminots Paray (6)
 AS Beaune (7)

Grand Est: 20 teams
 SAS Épinal (4)
 FCSR Haguenau (4)
 SC Schiltigheim (4)
 CS Sedan Ardennes (4)
 ASC Biesheim (5)
 RC Épernay Champagne (5)
 US Raon-l'Étape (5)
 FC Saint-Louis Neuweg (5)
 Sarreguemines FC (5)
 ES Thaon (5)
 FCA Troyes (5)
 RCS La Chapelle (6)
 FA Illkirch Graffenstaden (6)
 AS Prix-lès-Mézières (6)
 US Reipertswiller (6)
 Étoile Naborienne St Avold (6)
 US Avize-Grauves (7)
 ES Heillecourt (7)
 Olympique Strasbourg (7)
 FC Rossfeld (8)

Méditerranée: 5 teams
 Marignane Gignac FC (3)
 Étoile Fréjus Saint-Raphaël (4)
 Hyères FC (4)
 SC Toulon (4)
 FC Côte Bleue (5)

Occitanie: 11 teams
 Rodez AF (3)
 FC Sète 34 (4)
 Olympique Alès (5)
 Stade Beaucairois (5)
 Canet Roussillon FC (5)
 AF Lozère (5)
 US Salinières Aigues Mortes (6)
 Auch Football (6)
 Luzenac AP (6)
 St Orens FC (7)
 FC Biars-Bretenoux (8)

Hauts-de-France: 20 teams
 US Boulogne (3)
 FC Chambly (3)
 USL Dunkerque (3)
 Iris Club de Croix (4)
 Olympique Marcquois Football (5)
 Olympique Saint-Quentin (5)
 CS Avion (6)
 AFC Compiègne (6)
 AS Gamaches (6)
 US Gravelines (6)
 AS Marck (6)
 AS du Pays Neslois (6)
 US Nogent (6)
 Saint-Amand FC (6)
 US Saint-Omer (6)
 US Vimy (6)
 Wasquehal Football (6)
 CAS Escaudœuvres (7)
 ESC Longueau (7)
 ASC Hazebrouck (8)

Normandy: 8 teams
 US Avranches (3)
 CMS Oissel (4)
 AS Cherbourg Football (5)
 FC Saint-Lô Manche (5)
 AG Caennaise (6)
 Grand-Quevilly FC (6)
 USON Mondeville (6)
 AS Villers Houlgate Côte Fleurie (8)

Brittany: 14 teams
 US Concarneau (3)
 US Saint-Malo (4)
 Vannes OC (4)
 AS Vitré (4)
 Lannion FC (5)
 US Montagnarde (5)
 GSI Pontivy (5)
 Stade Pontivyen (5)
 FC Atlantique Vilaine (5)
 Guipavas GdR (6)
 AG Plouvorn (6)
 Avenir Theix (6)
 AS Vignoc-Hédé-Guipel (6)
 Stella Maris Douarnenez (7)

Paris-Île-de-France: 11 teams
 JA Drancy (3)
 L'Entente SSG (3)
 AF Bobigny (4)
 US Créteil-Lusitanos (4)
 Sainte-Geneviève Sports (4)
 US Lusitanos Saint-Maur (4)
 FC Versailles 78 (5)
 FC Melun (6)
 Noisy-le-Grand FC (6)
 ES Viry-Châtillon (6)
 AS Carrières Grésillons (9)

Auvergne-Rhône-Alpes: 19 teams
 Football Bourg-en-Bresse Péronnas 01 (3)
 AS Lyon-Duchère (3)
 FC Villefranche (3)
 ASF Andrézieux (4)
 Annecy FC (4)
 Le Puy Foot 43 Auvergne (4)
 FC Aurillac Arpajon Cantal Auvergne (5)
 FC Chamalières (5)
 FC Limonest Saint-Didier (5)
 Montluçon Football (5)
 UMS Montélimar (6)
 FC Riom (6)
 CS Volvic (6)
 US Annecy-le-Vieux (7)
 Chassieu Décines FC (7)
 US Feillens (7)
 Olympique de Valence (7)
 Entente Crest-Aouste (8)
 FC Val Lyonnais (8)

Overseas Territories teams

 French Guiana: 2 teams
 ASE Matoury
 US de Matoury

 Martinique: 2 teams
 Aiglon du Lamentin
 Golden Lion FC

 Guadeloupe: 2 teams
 JS Vieux-Habitants
 Unité Ste Rosienne

 Réunion: 2 teams
 SS Jeanne d'Arc
 AS Sainte-Suzanne

 Mayotte: 1 team
 FC Mtsapéré

 New Caledonia: 1 team
 AS Magenta

 Tahiti: 1 team
 AS Dragon

Seventh round
The draw for the seventh round was made in two parts. First the Overseas teams were drawn against opponents from the French League structure who had applied to potentially travel overseas. The main draw took place the following day.

The draw for the overseas teams took place on 30 October 2018. The main draw took place on 31 October 2018.

Matches took place on 16, 17 and 18 November 2018.

Ties involving overseas teams

Main draw
As in previous editions of the competition, the main draw was split into 10 regional groups, with the split primarily ensuring an equal distribution of clubs from the different tiers, and secondarily grouping by geography.

The lowest ranked team remaining in the competition at this stage was AS Carrières Grésillons from tier 9 (District division 1).

Matches took place on 16, 17 and 18 November 2018.

Group 7A

Group 7B

Group 7C

Group 7D

Group 7E

Group 7F

Group 7G

Group 7H

Group 7I

Group 7J

Eighth round
The draw for the eighth round was made in two parts. First the remaining overseas team was drawn against opponents from the French League structure who had applied to potentially travel overseas. The overseas team, Aiglon du Lamentin, played at home due to playing their seventh round match away from home. The main draw took place later in the day. Both draws took place on 20 November 2018.

Overseas draw

Main draw
As in previous editions of the competition, the main draw was split into 6 regional groups, with the split primarily ensuring an equal distribution of clubs from the different tiers, and secondarily grouping by geography.
The lowest ranked teams remaining in the competition at this stage were Entente Crest-Aouste and AS Villers Houlgate Côte Fleurie both from tier 8 (Regional League 3).

Matches took place on 8 and 9 December 2018, with three matches postponed until the following weekend.

Group 8A

Group 8B

Group 8C

Group 8D

Group 8E

Group 8F

Round of 64
The draw for the ninth round (known as the round of 64) took place on 10 December 2018. The 20 Ligue 1 teams joined the draw at this stage. The draw was split into four groups to ensure equal distribution of teams from each tier, with geographical proximity a secondary factor.

The lowest ranked teams remaining in the competition at this stage were Olympique Strasbourg and ESC Longueau both from tier 7 (Regional League 2). Olympique Strasbourg entered the competition in the first round, so had been in the competition longest.

Games were played on 4, 5, 6 and 7 January 2019.

Group 9A

Group 9B

Group 9C

Group 9D

Round of 32
The draw for the tenth round (known as the round of 32) took place on 7 January 2019. This was an open draw.

The lowest ranked teams remaining in the competition at this stage were Noisy-le-Grand FC and ES Viry-Châtillon, both from tier 6 (Regional League 1).

Games were played on 22, 23, 24 and 27 January 2019.

Round of 16
The draw for the eleventh round (known as the round of 16) took place on 24 January 2019. This was an open draw.

The lowest ranked team remaining in the competition at this stage was SC Bastia, from tier 5 (Championnat National 3).

Games were played on 5, 6 and 7 February 2019.

Quarter-finals
The draw for the quarter-finals took place on 6 February 2019. This was an open draw.

The lowest ranked team remaining in the competition at this stage was AS Vitré from tier 4 (Championnat National 2).

Games were played on 26 and 27 February and 6 March 2019.

Semi-finals
The draw for the semi-finals took place on 28 February 2019. This was an open draw.

Games were played on 2 and 3 April 2019.

Final

References

External links

 
France
Cup
Coupe de France seasons